Day of Despair is a 1992 Portuguese drama film based on the life of Portuguese writer Camilo Castelo Branco. It was directed by Manoel de Oliveira. The film was selected as the Portuguese entry for the Best Foreign Language Film at the 65th Academy Awards, but was not accepted as a nominee.

Cast
 Mário Barroso as Camilo Castelo Branco
 Teresa Madruga as Ana Plácido  
 Luís Miguel Cintra as Freitas Fortuna  
 Diogo Dória as Dr. Edmundo Magalhães

See also
 List of submissions to the 65th Academy Awards for Best Foreign Language Film
 List of Portuguese submissions for the Academy Award for Best Foreign Language Film

References

External links
 

1992 films
French drama films
1990s Portuguese-language films
1992 drama films
Films directed by Manoel de Oliveira
Films produced by Paulo Branco
Portuguese drama films
Biographical films about writers
1990s French films